Erik Lindhagen (born October 2, 1987) is a Swedish professional ice hockey centre who currently plays for Grüner Ishockey in Norway's GET-ligaen. Lindhagen previously iced with Guildford Flames of the Elite Ice Hockey League. He has previously played for Linköpings HC of the Elitserien and Nottingham Panthers.

References

External links

1987 births
Living people
Linköping HC players
Tingsryds AIF players
VIK Västerås HK players
Växjö Lakers players
Nottingham Panthers players
Guildford Flames players
Grüner Ishockey players
Timrå IK players
Sportspeople from Linköping
Swedish ice hockey centres
Sportspeople from Östergötland County